Antigonus, son of Echecrates, was the nephew of Antigonus III Doson. He revealed to Philip V of Macedon a few months before his death in 179 BCE, the false accusations of his son Perseus of Macedon against his other son Demetrius, in consequence of which Philip put the latter to death. Indignant at the conduct of Perseus, Philip appointed Antigonus his successor; but on his death, Perseus obtained possession of the throne, and had Antigonus killed.

Notes

3rd-century BC Macedonians
3rd-century BC Greek people
Antigonid dynasty